Millers Run is a tributary of Shamokin Creek in Northumberland County, Pennsylvania, in the United States. The stream is not impacted by mining and is not designated as an impaired waterbody. It is a small stream near the lower Shamokin Creek watershed. A number of bridges have been constructed over it. The watershed of Millers Run is designated as a Coldwater Fishery and a Migratory Fishery.

Course

Millers Run begins on a hill in Ralpho Township. It enters a valley and flows west-southwest for several tenths of a mile before turning west. After a few tenths of a mile, it turns west-southwest. Several tenths of a mile further downstream, the stream turns northwest for more than a mile before turning west and flowing alongside Gilgers Ridge. After a few tenths of a mile, it turns south and then northwest before reaching its confluence with Shamokin Creek.

Hydrology
Millers Run is an unimpaired waterbody, as are all other streams in its watershed. It is not impacted by mining.

In April 1975, the specific conductance of Millers Run was measured to be 71 micro-siemens per centimeter.

Detectable amounts of boron, cobalt, lithium, and zinc were observed.

The bicarbonate concentration of Millers Run was measured to be  in April 1975.

Geography, geology, and watershed

Millers Run is a relatively small stream.

The stream is entirely within the United States Geological Survey quadrangle of Shamokin. The watershed borders the lower Shamokin Creek watershed. It is in the southeastern part of the northern part of the creek's drainage basin.

History
Millers Run was entered into the Geographic Names Information System on August 2, 1979. Its identifier in the Geographic Names Information System is 1181247.

A concrete slab bridge carrying State Route 2016 over Millers Run was built in 1918. A bridge of the same type, but carrying State Route 2016 was built over the stream in 1930. A concrete culvert bridge was built over the stream south of Paxinos in 1998.

A $1000 bridge rehabilitation of a bridge carrying State Route 2018 over Millers Run was authorized by the state of Pennsylvania in Act 1996-9 (SS2) in the mid-1990s.

Biology
The drainage basin of Millers Run is designated as a Coldwater Fishery and a Migratory Fishery. Some aquatic life exists within the stream. It has historically contained a healthy population of aquatic life.

See also
Lick Creek (Shamokin Creek), next tributary of Shamokin Creek going downstream
Bennys Run, next tributary of Shamokin Creek going upstream
List of rivers of Pennsylvania
List of tributaries of Shamokin Creek

References

Rivers of Northumberland County, Pennsylvania
Tributaries of Shamokin Creek
Rivers of Pennsylvania